Dagupan station was a terminus of the Philippine National Railways Northrail in Dagupan, Pangasinan.

History
Dagupan was opened on November 24, 1892 as the terminus of the then Manila-Dagupan Railroad.

A new station, made of rubble stone structure was built near the present day PNR Court during the line's extension to La Union.

Aftermath
Although the line was abandoned years ago, both of the two station buildings still stands up to this day, the platform area of original station building currently serves as a dumpsite.

References

Philippine National Railways stations
Railway stations in Pangasinan
Buildings and structures in Dagupan